Thelymitra × chasmogama, commonly called the globe-hood sun orchid, is a species of orchid that is endemic to south-eastern Australia. It has a single tapering, channelled leaf with a reddish base and up to six bright pink flowers with pale yellow tufts on top of the anther. It is a natural hybrid between T. luteocilium and T. megacalyptra.

Description
There are two bracts along the flowering stem. The lobe on the top of the anther has a purplish brown band and a deeply notched yellow tip. The side lobes have pale yellow hair tufts on their ends. Flowering occurs from September to November. The plants are variable, due to back-crossing with the two parent species, T. luteocilium and T. megacalyptra.

Taxonomy and naming
Thelymitra × chasmogama was first formally described in 1927 by Richard Sanders Rogers from a specimen collected near Golden Grove and the description was published in Transactions and Proceedings of the Royal Society of South Australia.

Distribution and habitat
The globe-hood sun orchid grows where its two parent species occur, in woodland, open forest and scrub. It occurs in central Victoria and in the south-east of South Australia.

References

External links

chasmogama
Endemic orchids of Australia
Orchids of Victoria (Australia)
Orchids of South Australia
Plants described in 1927
Interspecific orchid hybrids